John Michael Salas Torres (born October 12, 1996) is a Chilean footballer who currently plays as full back for Chilean club Unión La Calera.

Career
After playing loaned from Universidad de Chile to Segunda División Profesional clubs, he was loaned to Primera División club Coquimbo Unido for all 2019 season. After, on 2020 season, he joined Coquimbo Unido as a free agent. Along with Coquimbo Unido, he has played at the 2020 Copa Sudamericana.

Honours
Universidad de Chile
 Primera División (1): 2017-C

Coquimbo Unido
 Primera B (1): 2021

References

External links
 

Living people
1996 births
Chilean footballers
Chilean Primera División players
Primera B de Chile players
Segunda División Profesional de Chile players
Universidad de Chile footballers
Deportes Santa Cruz footballers
Deportes Iberia footballers
Coquimbo Unido footballers
Everton de Viña del Mar footballers
Association football defenders
Place of birth missing (living people)